The 2004 Junior League World Series took place from August 15–21 in Taylor, Michigan, United States. Tampa, Florida defeated Punto Fijo, Venezuela in the championship game.

Teams

Results

United States Pool

International Pool

Elimination Round

References

Junior League World Series
Junior League World Series
Junior League
Sports in Tampa, Florida
Baseball in Michigan